Deceit is a British four-part television drama miniseries, based on the true story of a controversial undercover operation carried out by the Metropolitan Police in 1992. Niamh Algar stars as the undercover police officer, codenamed "Lizzie James", who attempts to entrap a suspect in a murder investigation. It premiered on Channel 4 on 13 August 2021, and all subsequent episodes were made available for streaming on All 4 that same day after broadcast. The series, written by Emilia di Girolamo and produced by Story Films, received critical acclaim.

Cast
 Niamh Algar as Sadie Byrne / Lizzie James
 Sion Daniel Young as Colin Stagg
 Eddie Marsan as Paul Britton
 Harry Treadaway as DI Keith Pedder
 Rochenda Sandall as Lucy
 Nathaniel Martello-White as Baz
 Jack Riddiford as Robert Napper
 Simon Kunz as Sir Harry Ognall

Production
In August 2020, Channel 4 Drama announced they had commissioned a new show with the working title My Name is Lizzie, examining the investigation into the killing of Rachel Nickell in 1992.

Later retitled Deceit, the show includes scenes of verbatim dialogue as part of a fictionalised retelling of events.

Release
It was first shown on Channel 4 each week, starting on 13 August 2021. All four episodes were made available on the channel's streaming service All 4 after the first episode was broadcast.

Episodes

Critical reception
Lucy Mangan, writing for The Guardian, praises Algar's "phenomenal performance" and MacCormicks "magnificent and stylish" direction, and says the only problem the show has is that "it is dealing with events that are stranger than fiction." Sara Wallis from Daily Mirror believes that the miniseries are "not hammer-blow viewing that reconstructs grisly murders" but a more detailed account of the impact of undercover work on Sadie. During the BBC Radio 5 Live program, Algar expressed her opinion of Emilia di Girolamo's work, calling it "something unique" and "one of the most exciting dramas."

Sean O'Grady, writing for The Independent, named Deceit "a gripping portrayal of a real-life undercover operation".

References

External links
 

2021 British television series debuts
2021 British television series endings
2020s British crime drama television series
2020s British television miniseries
2020s British workplace drama television series
2020s police procedural television series
Television series by All3Media
Channel 4 crime television shows
Channel 4 television dramas
English-language television shows
Television series set in 1992
Television series set in 1993
Television series set in 1994
Television series set in 2008
Television shows about murder
Television shows set in London
True crime television series
Films directed by Niall MacCormick